The ATP São Paulo (also referred to by its sponsored names Banespa Open and Sul America Open) is a defunct men's tennis tournament that was played on ATP Tour from 1991 through 1993. The event was held in São Paulo, Brazil and was played on hard in 1991 and 1992 at Hotel Transamerica, and clay in 1993 at Esporte Clube Pinheiros. The tournament was a replacement for the ATP Itaparica which finished in 1990.

Results

Singles

Doubles

See also
 São Paulo WCT
 Brasil Open

External links
ATP Tour website

Hard court tennis tournaments
São Paulo
ATP Tour